Native Namibians may refer to:
Bantu peoples
Khoisans
Coloured people in Namibia

Indigenous peoples of Southern Africa